Hydropsyche venularis is a species of netspinning caddisflies in the family Hydropsychidae. It is found in North America.

References

Further reading

 Arnett, Ross H. (2000). American Insects: A Handbook of the Insects of America North of Mexico. CRC Press.

External links

 NCBI Taxonomy Browser, Hydropsyche venularis

Trichoptera